Live! The Ike & Tina Turner Show is a live album by Ike & Tina Turner released on Warner Bros. Records in 1965. In 1967, The Ike & Tina Turner Show – Vol. 2, consisting of different recordings from the same shows was released on Loma Records.

Recording and release 
Since their inception as Ike & Tina Turner in 1960, the duo had been signed to Sue Records. After four years with Sue, they signed with Kent Records. Known for their live performances, their first live album, Ike & Tina Turner Revue Live, charted on Cash Box's Top Albums chart in January 1965. However, their Kent deal failed to produce any hits, so they signed with Loma Records.

Live! The Ike & Tina Turner Show was released on Loma's parent label, Warner Bros. Records. It was recorded live at the Skyliner Ballroom (Fort Worth, Texas) and the Lovall's Ballroom (Dallas, Texas) in 1964. The album features performances by Ikettes Venetta Fields and Jessie Smith, and vocalist Jimmy Thomas. Released in January 1965, the album was Ike & Tina Turner's first album to reach the Billboard charts, peaking at No. 126 on Billboard Top LPs and No. 8 on Hot R&B LPs.

Ike & Tina Turner's cover of "Something's Got A Hold On Me" by Etta James was released as a single in Norway retitled "Something's Got A Hold Of Me".

Critical reception 
Billboard (February 6, 1965): "The husband and wife team have hit with a few pop and r&b hits in the past. Their hits have always been exciting. Here they go the same route with a pounding, driving, wailing sound. Chorus and big brass, plus hubby, give Tina's wailing great support."

Cash Box (February 20, 1965): The hearty rhythm and blues sound of Ike and Tina Turner should sell up a storm among their fans on this new set from Warner Brothers. The "live" taping was made at two separate shows, and exhibits all the drive and verve that has made the pair popular for many years. Guesting on the set are Jimmy Thomas, Vanetta Fields and Jessie Smith. Great soul sounds include: "Something's Got A Hold On Me", "You Are My Sunshine", and "Twist And Shout". There should be no trouble in marketing this platter in r&b areas, and it could well grab some pop exposure. 

Reviewing the compilation Live! The Ike & Tina Turner Show (Volume I & II), Bruce Eder of AllMusic wrote: Not only is the sound superb and the performance of the band spot-on, but Tina Turner is in exceptionally good voice. The range of material -- from R&B standards like "Hi Heel Sneakers" (done here as "Tight Pants") to country-pop songs such as "I Can't Stop Loving You" -- is not only astounding, but a brilliant showcase for the duo and their band.

Reissues 
In 1969, Warner Bros. released Ike & Tina Turner's Greatest Hits, which contains songs from Live! The Ike & Tina Turner Show and The Ike & Tina Turner Show – Vol. 2.

Live! The Ike & Tina Turner Show was reissued in 1970 as On Stage by Valiant Records in the UK. It was also reissued in 1971 as Something's Got A Hold On Me by Harmony Records with three tracks removed.

In 2000, Live! The Ike & Tina Turner Show was reissued by One Way Records on compilation CD Live! The Ike & Tina Turner Show (Volume I & II). In 2006, Live! The Ike & Tina Turner Show (Volume I & II) was reissued on CD by DBK Works.

Track listing 
All songs lead vocal by Tina Tuner except where noted.

Chart performance

The Ike & Tina Turner Show – Vol. 2 

The Ike & Tina Turner Show – Vol. 2 is the follow up album to Live! The Ike & Tina Turner Show. Released by Loma Records in January 1967, the album was recorded at the same concerts as its predecessor. In 1969, the album was reissued as Ooh Poo Pah Doo by Harmony Records and received a 4 star rating from Billboard.

Critical reception 

Cash Box (February 4, 1967): "The Ike And Tina Turner Show (Vol. 2)" is a rousing, wailing package that might easily establish itself as a big sales item in R&B circles. Among the numbers on the set are "Shake A Tail Feather", "You Must Believe Me", "Somebody (Somewhere) Needs You", and "Keep On A Pushin'". This one could really happen for Ike and Tina Turner.Billboard (February 11, 1967): "Proved successes, Ike and Tina Turner whip up a live show package of tunes here that could be a chart winner. Songs include 'It's All Over,' 'A Fool for You,' and 'Shake a Tail Feather.' Real Soul.

Track listing 

All songs sang lead by Tina Tuner except where noted.

References 

Live blues albums
Ike & Tina Turner live albums
1965 live albums
Warner Records live albums
1967 live albums
Rhythm and blues albums by American artists